Tayyab Aslam (born 9 August 1996 in Lahore) is a Pakistani professional squash player. As of February 2018, he was ranked number 123 in the world.

References

1996 births
Living people
Pakistani male squash players
Asian Games bronze medalists for Pakistan
Asian Games medalists in squash
Squash players at the 2018 Asian Games
Medalists at the 2018 Asian Games
Commonwealth Games competitors for Pakistan
Squash players at the 2018 Commonwealth Games
South Asian Games gold medalists for Pakistan
South Asian Games medalists in squash
21st-century Pakistani people